David Kent Hidalgo (born October 6, 1954, in Los Angeles) is an American singer-songwriter, best known for his work with the band Los Lobos. Hidalgo frequently plays musical instruments such as accordion, violin, 6-string banjo, cello, requinto jarocho, percussion, drums and guitar as a session musician on other artists' releases.

Early life and education

Career
In 1973, Hidalgo was one of the founding members of Los Lobos, for which he wrote most songs together with Louie Pérez. Additionally, he also participated as a guest musician on albums of other artists, including  David Alvin, Buckwheat Zydeco, Paul Burlison, T-Bone Burnett, Peter Case, Toni Childs, Marc Cohn, Ry Cooder, Elvis Costello, Crowded House, The Fabulous Thunderbirds, John Lee Hooker, Rickie Lee Jones, Leo Kottke, Roy Orbison, Dolly Parton, Pierce Pettis, Bonnie Raitt, Paul Simon, Taj Mahal, Suzanne Vega, Bob Dylan and Tom Waits.  He is a member of the supergroup Los Super Seven and of the Latin Playboys, a side project made up of some of the members of Los Lobos. With Mike Halby of Canned Heat, he formed another band, Houndog, as a side project. He also appeared on national television in the U.S., backing Tom Waits.

For the movie Promised Land, he contributed in 1987 the song "Will the Wolf Survive". For Dennis Hopper's film drama Colors (1988), he wrote the song "One Time, One Night". He wrote the songs "Manifold De Amour", "Forever Night Shade Mary" and "Chinese Surprize" for the 1995 action film Desperado as well as the melancholic song "La pistola y el corazón" for the movie The Mexican (2001).

Hidalgo's songs have been covered by the Jerry Garcia Band, Waylon Jennings, Bonnie Raitt and others. He has performed in Eric Clapton's Crossroads Guitar Festival since its inception in 2004, including a performance with Los Lobos in April 2013 at Madison Square Garden. Clapton joined the band on stage for their song "Burn It Down", from their 2010 album, Tin Can Trust.

Personal life and family 

His son, David Jr., is the drummer for the band Social Distortion. His other son Vincent has played bass for the band Mariachi El Bronx.

Discography

Selected collaborations
 Eric Clapton (Crossroads festival DVD, CD) 
 Buckwheat Zydeco (multiple projects)
 T-Bone Burnett (guitar, accordion, vocals, 8-String Bass on T-Bone Burnett (1986)
 Peter Case (The Man with the Blue Post Modern Fragmented Neo-Traditionalist Guitar)
 Elvis Costello (harmony vocal on King of America, guitar and harmony vocal on Momofuku)
 Toni Childs (House of Hope)
 Crowded House (accordion "As Sure as I Am" on Woodface (1991))
 John Hammond (guitar, mandolin, vocals on Ready for love (2003))
 John Lee Hooker (multiple projects)
 Roy Orbison (King of Hearts)
 Willy DeVille (Backstreets of Desire, Crow Jane Alley)
 Rickie Lee Jones (Traffic from Paradise, The Evening of My Best Day)
 Ozomatli (multiple projects)
 Dolly Parton (Treasures)
 Pierce Pettis (Chase the Buffalo)
 Ry Cooder (Chávez Ravine)
 Paul Simon ("All Around the World or The Myth of Fingerprints" on Graceland (1986))
 Marc Ribot (Border Music)
 Tonio K. (Olé)
 Bonnie Raitt (Fundamental)
 Tremoloco (Dulcinea)
 Suzanne Vega (99.9F°)
 Tom Waits (accordion on "Cold, Cold Ground" and "Train Song" on Frank's Wild Years (1987); accordion and violin on "Whistle Down the Wind" on Bone Machine (1992); guitar, accordion, violin, bass, backing vocals on several tracks on Bad As Me (2011))
 The 1994 tribute to songwriter Mark Heard, Strong Hand of Love Leo Kottke (Try and Stop Me)
 Gov't Mule (Politician) (guitar and vocals on The Deepest End, Live in Concert)
 Bob Dylan (accordion on Together Through Life and Christmas in the Heart; guitar, accordion, violin on Tempest)
 G. Love & Special Sauce (viola on "Missing My Baby")
 Los Cenzontles (co-producer, songwriter and multi-instrumentalist on Songs of Wood & Steel)
 Taj Mahal & Los Cenzontles (co-producer, songwriter and multi-instrumentalist on "American Horizon")
 Mato Nanji, Luther Dickinson (3 Skulls and the Truth'', Blues Bureau International)

DVDs

Music videos

References

External links

 Los Lobos
 [ David Hidalgo] at Allmusic.com

1954 births
Living people
American male singers
Songwriters from Arizona
American session musicians
American musicians of Mexican descent
Hispanic and Latino American musicians
Singers from Los Angeles
Los Lobos members
Spanish-language singers of the United States
Songwriters from California
Singers from Arizona
Latin Playboys members
21st-century accordionists
21st-century American male musicians
American male songwriters